Robert Sorcher (born December 22, 1961) is an American television executive producer for Warner Bros. Television Group.  Sorcher was formerly executive vice president and global chief content officer at Cartoon Network, starting his job in 2008, and promoted in 2013. He was a producer for We Bare Bears, Adventure Time, Clarence, Regular Show, Steven Universe, Over the Garden Wall, The Powerpuff Girls and Ben 10.  As chief content officer, he was responsible for original content development for Cartoon Network and Cartoon Network Studios   Sorcher previously worked at AMC Network where he introduced scripted originals to the channel, including the Emmy award winning Broken Trail and the Peabody Award winning series; Mad Men and Breaking Bad.

Career 
Rob Sorcher oversaw Cartoon Network Studios in Los Angeles, where he executive produced content for worldwide distribution to 192 countries and 370 million homes. He managed all content, which in the past included series like Steven Universe and Adventure Time, CN Games and the flagship CN app.

Sorcher's career worked with several advertisement companies such as Grey Advertising, Griffin-Bacal, and Benton & Bowles.

He also worked for AMC Network as its executive vice president of programming and production. He was credited with leading the network to tremendous growth, thanks to his introduction of scripted originals and Emmy-award winning series such as Mad Men and  Breaking Bad, which were both named by the New York Times among the 20 best TV dramas since The Sopranos, and the mini-series Broken Trail.

Prior to AMC, Sorcher was EVP and GM of USA Network for a short time prior to the sudden appointment of Doug Herzog.

Sorcher had also served as EVP of Programming/Production at Fox Family Channel, and earlier in his career worked as the first general manager of Cartoon Network with the creation of his The Cartoonstitute variety project. He moved to start his own production company.

Selected credits

Television series – executive producer

Other programs – executive producer

Primetime Emmy awards

Other awards

References

External links 
 

1961 births
Living people
Businesspeople from Syracuse, New York
American advertising executives
Place of birth missing (living people)
People from Los Angeles
Primetime Emmy Award winners
Cartoon Network executives
Cartoon Network Studios people